William Knox (born 1904) was a Scottish professional footballer who played as a half back.

Career
Born in Glasgow, Knox signed for Bradford City in September 1925 from Shettleston, leaving the club in 1927. During his time with Bradford City he made 11 appearances in the Football League.

Sources

References

1904 births
Date of death missing
Scottish footballers
Glasgow United F.C. players
Bradford City A.F.C. players
English Football League players
Association football midfielders